Herriman may refer to:

Surname
Damon Herriman, Australian actor
Delme Herriman, a British former professional basketball player
Don Herriman, a retired Canadian professional ice hockey forward
George Herriman, American cartoonist

Other
Herriman, Utah, a city in southwestern Salt Lake County
Mr. Herriman, cartoon character
Herriman High School, a public high school in Herriman, Utah

See also
Harriman (disambiguation)